Marimba Lumina is a MIDI controller developed by American engineer Don Buchla that lets a musician play music via a control surface based on the layout of a marimba. Joel Davel and Mark Goldstein were the co-developers of the design and implementation of the hardware and software. The defining characteristic is its use of RF technology for the recognition of location along the key/bar and recognition of each of four mallets as a potentially unique input—allowing it to play stylistically conventional or unconventional music.

The curved 4-1/3 octave Marimba Lumina "Gold" was first introduced in 1999 and played by Buchla “associate” Joel Davel at the Bell-Atlantic Jazz Festival in New York City.  Later versions introduced in 2000 and 2001 were produced in collaboration with Nearfield Multimedia and include a 3.5 and 2.5 octave range.

Performers known for playing the Marimba Lumina include Joel Davel of the Paul Dresher Ensemble, Vessela Stoyanova of Bury Me Standing and Goli, and Max Lord. Toby Dammit with The Residents and Tortoise have also used it on tour.  Since 2013, Jon Fishman and sometimes Trey Anastasio have both played a Marimba Lumina during live Phish concerts. The drummer Danny Carey of the band Tool uses a marimba lumina on stage when playing the song Invincible.

The Absolute Deviation venture is the remaining source of support for the instrument. Limited numbers of new Marimba Luminas and CPU upgrades can still be purchased through Absolute Deviation.

Description
Control Surface: Velocity-, position-, and contact-sensitive bars are laid out in an array similar to a conventional marimba. Additional controller strips and pads provide other functions.

Controller: Specialized color-coded mallets must be used as the surface will not recognize conventional ones.

See also
 Thunder, a tactile MIDI controller
 Lightning, a spatial MIDI controller

External links
 Marimba Lumina at Absolute Deviation

References

Electronic musical instruments